is a railway station in the town of Ishikawa, Fukushima, Japan operated by East Japan Railway Company (JR East).

Lines

Station layout
Nogisawa Station has one side platform serving a single bi-directional track. The station formerly had two opposed side platforms, but one of the platforms is no longer in use. The station is unattended.

History
The station opened on December 4, 1934. The station was absorbed into the JR East network upon the privatization of the Japanese National Railways (JNR) on April 1, 1987.

Surrounding area
Nogisawa Post Office

See also
 List of Railway Stations in Japan

External links

  

Stations of East Japan Railway Company
Railway stations in Fukushima Prefecture
Suigun Line
Railway stations in Japan opened in 1934
Ishikawa, Fukushima